The 1921 Rutgers Queensmen football team represented Rutgers University as an independent during the 1921 college football season. In their ninth season under head coach George Sanford, the Queensmen compiled a 4–5 record and were outscored by their opponents, 168 to 99. Coach Sanford was inducted into the College Football Hall of Fame in 1971.

Schedule

References

Rutgers
Rutgers Scarlet Knights football seasons
Rutgers Queensmen football